The 1981 James Hardie 1000 was the 22nd running of the Bathurst 1000 touring car race. It was held on 4 October 1981 at the Mount Panorama Circuit just outside Bathurst. The race was open to cars eligible to the locally developed CAMS Group C touring car regulations with three engine configuration based classes, a system used uniquely for this race.

For the first time the race did not go the full race distance as on lap 121, a six car accident blocked the track at McPhillamy Park Corner. The Ford Falcon of Dick Johnson and John French were leading the race at the time of the accident and were declared the winners, becoming the first Queenslanders to win the race. Bob Morris and British endurance racer John Fitzpatrick, also driving a Falcon finished second. A lap down in third was Allan Moffat and British endurance racing great Derek Bell driving a Mazda RX-7, the best ever result to that point for a Japanese built car.

History was made at Bathurst in 1981. For the first (and as of 2020, the only) time in the races history, a reigning Formula One World Drivers' Champion drove in the Bathurst 1000. This honour fell to Australia's own  World Champion Alan Jones who co-drove with Warren Cullen in Cullen's V8 Holden Commodore.

After 8 wins in the race dating back to Bob Jane and Harry Firth's win in a Ford Falcon XL at Phillip Island in 1962, this would prove to be the last Bathurst 1000 win for the Ford Falcon until 1994. It would also be the 5th and last Bathurst win for the 5.8 L 351 Cleveland V8 engine.

Class structure

Class : 8 Cylinder & Over
This class was almost exclusively for V8s; Holden Commodores, Ford Falcons and Chevrolet Camaros. The exception being a V12 Jaguar XJ-S.

Class : 6 Cylinder (Includes Rotary Engines)
The class for six-cylinder and rotary-engined cars was contested mostly by Ford Capris, with a single factory supported BMW 635CSi and those Mazda RX7s entered, powered by Rotary engines.

Class : 4 Cylinder
The class for cars with four-cylinder engines included Alfa Romeo Alfasud, Alfa Romeo Alfetta, Ford Escort, Isuzu Gemini, Mitsubishi Colt, Mitsubishi Lancer, Nissan Bluebird Turbo, Toyota Celica, Toyota Corolla, Triumph Dolomite and Volkswagen Golf.

Hardies Heroes

* This was the first Top 10 shootout to be held in wet conditions, though conditions were damp for the first ever shootout in 1978.* For the 2nd year running, Kevin Bartlett was fastest qualifier and won Hardies Heroes in his Channel 9 sponsored Chevrolet Camaro. It was also the second year in a row that Dick Johnson would equal Bartlett's time in qualifying, but would be slower in the shootout. Due to the extremely wet conditions, Bartlett's runoff time was almost 16 seconds slower than his time in qualifying.* This was the first time a car powered by something other than a V8 engine had contested Hardies Heroes. The honor went to the 12A Rotary powered Mazda RX-7 of Allan Moffat who ended up 5th on the grid.* The gap of 2.381 seconds between Bartlett and Johnson broke the 1979 record of 1.966 seconds between Peter Brock and Bob Morris. As of the 2018 race, Bartlett's shootout record remains unbeaten.

Race
The race was stopped on lap 122 because of a multiple-car incident that blocked the track at McPhillamy Park Corner. The accident began with a collision between the Ford Falcons of Bob Morris and Christine Gibson. Garry Rogers and Tony Edmondson (both driving Holden Commodores) and the Isuzu Gemini of David Seldon collided with already crashed cars with the Chevrolet Camaro of Kevin Bartlett being the final car to be involved.

According to the regulations, the race was declared based on the timesheets as the race leader, at the time John French, completed lap 120. This is done so that crashed vehicles can be included in the results. This was particularly significant in this instance as a significant number of the vehicles involved held high race position. Morris was second, Rogers fourth, Edmondson fifth and Christine Gibson sixth.

Results

References

Statistics
 Provisional Pole Position - #9 Kevin Bartlett - 2:18.7
 Pole Position - #9 Kevin Bartlett - 2:36.432
 Fastest Lap - #17 Dick Johnson - 2:20.98 (lap record)
 Average Speed - 151 km/h
 Race Time - 4:53:52.7

External links
 Race results, www.uniquecarsandparts.com.au
 Images, autopics.com.au

Motorsport in Bathurst, New South Wales
James Hardie 1000